Mihai Țiu (born 25 January 1946) is a Romanian fencer. He competed in the individual and team foil events at the 1968, 1972, 1976 and 1980 Summer Olympics.

References

1946 births
Living people
Romanian male fencers
Romanian foil fencers
Olympic fencers of Romania
Fencers at the 1968 Summer Olympics
Fencers at the 1972 Summer Olympics
Fencers at the 1976 Summer Olympics
Fencers at the 1980 Summer Olympics
Sportspeople from Bucharest
Universiade medalists in fencing
Universiade silver medalists for Romania